George Folsom Walcott was a Union Army officer during the American Civil War.

George F. Walcott was born December 22, 1836 in Hopkinton, Massachusetts. He was a graduate of Harvard University in 1857 and Harvard University Law School in 1860 and a lawyer.

On August 5, 1861, Walcott was appointed captain of the 21st Regiment Massachusetts Volunteer Infantry. He resigned on April 25, 1863. He was appointed captain of the 12th Regiment of Massachusetts Militia on May 16, 1864. He was mustered out of the volunteers on August 15, 1864. He was appointed lieutenant colonel of the 61st Regiment Massachusetts Volunteer Infantry on September 24, 1864 and colonel of the regiment on February 28, 1865. Walcott was mustered out of the volunteers on June 4, 1865. On January 13, 1866, President Andrew Johnson nominated Walcott for appointment to the grade of brevet brigadier general of volunteers for gallant and meritorious service resulting in the fall of Richmond, Virginia and surrender of the Army of Northern Virginia, to rank from April 9, 1865, and the United States Senate confirmed the appointment on March 12, 1866.

Walcott was the author of History of the Twenty-First Regiment, Massachusetts Volunteers, in the War for the Preservation of the Union, 1861-1865. Boston: Houghton, Mifflin, 1882. .

Charles F. Walcott died June 11, 1881 in Salem, Massachusetts. He was buried in Mount Auburn Cemetery, Cambridge, Massachusetts.

See also

 1872 Massachusetts legislature
List of American Civil War generals (Union)

References

Union Army colonels
1836 births
1887 deaths
Harvard Law School alumni
Burials at Mount Auburn Cemetery
People from Hopkinton, Massachusetts
Military personnel from Massachusetts